Hurst v Picture Theatres Ltd [1915] 1 KB 1 is an English land law case, concerning licences "in" land, specifically ticketed events.  The appeal court confirmed that there is no right, based on e.g. land owner's discretion as to determining trespassers, to remove the attendee if the venue operator is mistaken as to the attendee's right to attend.

Facts
Mr Hurst bought a ticket for 17 March 1913's screening of Lake Garda in a London cinema of Picture Theatres Ltd. The manager honestly believed he had not paid for his seat. He was forced to leave, and then he claimed trespass to the person. The theatre argued that even though it revoked (breached) the licence, a contract relating to a person's right to be somewhere, its mistaken belief could render Hurst a trespasser (if so reasonable force could be used to remove him).

The issue was whether the claimant was entitled to damages under trespass to the person.

Channell J held, with a jury, Hurst could get damages.

Judgment
Buckley LJ confirmed the award.

See also

English property law
English tort law

Notes

English land case law
1915 in case law
1915 in British law
Court of Appeal (England and Wales) cases